Vasum frequens is an extinct species of medium to large sea snail, a marine gastropod mollusk in the family Turbinellidae.

Description
Measurements of the shell : 47 mm x 44 mm.

Distribution
Fossils of this marine species have been found in Eocene strata of Egypt

References

 Cossmann (M.), 1901 Additions à la faune nummulitique d'Égypte. Bulletin de l'Institut Égyptien, sér. 4, t. 1, vol. 6, p. 173-197
 Cossmann (M.), 1901 Essais de Paléoconchologie comparée. livraison 4, p. 1-293, fig. 1-31 
 Douvillé (H.), 1921 - Mélanges paléontologiques : genre Eovasum - Glauconiidae, Pleuroceratidae, Pirenidae - genre Itruvia. Journal de Conchyliologie, vol. 66, p. 1-18

External links
 Cuvillier, Jean. "Contribution a l’etude geologique du Mokattam." Bulletin de l’Institut d’Egypte 6.1 (1923): 93-102.
 Cossmann, Maurice. "Additions à la faune nummulitique d’Égypte." Bulletin de l’institut d’Égypte 4.1 (1900): 173-198.

frequens
Gastropods described in 1895